King's Schools is a private Christian school, Preschool through 12th grade, located in Shoreline, Washington. 98% of the graduates of King's High School go on to higher education.

History
King's was founded in 1950 by Mike and Vivian Martin. Originally called "King's Garden", the school's roots were in weekly Bible studies and fellowship meetings in the Martin's home.

Controversy over Anti-LGBTQ stance 
In September 2019, it was revealed through multiple media sources around the globe that King's Schools (and their parent organization Crista Ministries), had hardened their stance on acceptance of homosexuality at the school.

This policy required teachers to disavow same-sex relationships, both on the job and in their personal lives.  It further required that they teach that homosexuality is “a result of the failure to worship God,” a belief that has little to no biblical support. Once notified of this policy, numerous teachers left of their own accord and more were forced out of the school.  However, non-disclosure agreements prevented many of those teachers from speaking about the issue and the true impact on the school. Megan Troutman, an English teacher who left as a result of the new policy, noted that she "cannot, in good faith or conscience, teach in a place that creates policies that negatively impact an entire section of the student population...I could not be complicit in a policy that could harm or ostracize any student.” 

As a result of these actions, many families left the school because they did not support or did not want to fund a discriminatory organization.  It was expected that many more teachers and families would follow suit, raising questions about the direction that doctrinal direction that King's School would take, with many concerned over extreme right-wing influences. Comments on social media and other platforms indicated an increasing divide between groups supporting King's anti-LGBTQ stance and those opposing it. Much of the blame for the new policy was attributed to Jacinta Tegman, the new CEO of Crista Ministries.  Tegman was formerly the executive director of "Sound the Alarm," which sought to use political action to repeal gay marriage as well as legal protections for LGBTQ citizens.  Tegman's effort, Referendum 65, ultimately failed as she was unable to obtain enough signatures to place it on the ballot.

References

External links
King's Schools Website

Private elementary schools in Washington (state)
Private middle schools in Washington (state)
High schools in King County, Washington
Schools in Seattle
Private high schools in Washington (state)